The Diocese of St Edmundsbury and Ipswich is a Church of England diocese based in Ipswich, covering Suffolk (excluding Lowestoft). The cathedral is St Edmundsbury Cathedral, and the bishop is the Bishop of St Edmundsbury and Ipswich.  It is part of the Province of Canterbury.

The diocese was formed on 23 January 1914 from part of the Diocese of Norwich and the Diocese of Ely.

Though the diocesan offices, the bishops' offices and residences are all in Ipswich – only the cathedral (and its offices) are in Bury St Edmunds – the diocese is nonetheless often referred to as St Edmundsbury diocese. Both the diocese and the diocesan bishop are commonly called "(St) Eds and Ips."

Bishops
Alongside the diocesan Bishop of St Edmundsbury and Ipswich (Martin Seeley), the Diocese has one suffragan bishop: the Bishop suffragan of Dunwich (Mike Harrison since 24 February 2016.) There are also some retired bishops living in the diocese who are licensed as honorary assistant bishops:
2008–present: Gavin Reid, former Bishop of Maidstone, lives in Beccles.
2008–present: Jeremy Walsh, retired Bishop suffragan of Tewkesbury, lives in Martlesham.
2012–present: Retired Dean of St Paul's and former Bishop of Sodor and Man Graeme Knowles lives in Bury St Edmunds (and is also licensed in neighbouring Ely diocese.)
2012–present: Former vicar of HTB Sandy Millar lives in Aldeburgh and is also an honorary assistant bishop in London.
2015–present: Tim Stevens. retired Bishop of Leicester and former Bishop of Dunwich.

Alternative episcopal oversight (for parishes in the diocese which reject the ministry of priests who are women) is provided by the provincial episcopal visitor, Norman Banks, Bishop suffragan of Richborough, who is licensed as an honorary assistant bishop of the diocese in order to facilitate his work there.

Archdeaconries and deaneries 

The Archdeacon of Ipswich now only has oversight of the Deanery of Ipswich and Inspiring Ipswich mission project.

*including Cathedral

Archdeacon for Rural Mission
On 11 January 2019, it was announced that Sally Gaze, the Diocese's "Dean of Rural Mission Consultancy" since 2017, would become "Archdeacon for Rural Mission". She was collated archdeacon and installed a Diocesan Canon Residentiary of St Edmundsbury Cathedral on 10 February 2019; the post is new and has no territorial archdeaconry attached.

List of churches

Not in a deanery

Deanery of Bosmere

Deanery of Colneys

Deanery of Hadleigh

Deanery of Ipswich

Deanery of Samford

Deanery of Stowmarket

Deanery of Woodbridge

Deanery of Clare

Deanery of Ixworth

Deanery of Lavenham

Deanery of Mildenhall

Deanery of Sudbury

Deanery of Thingoe

Deanery of Hartismere

Deanery of Hoxne

Deanery of Loes

Deanery of Saxmundham

Deanery of Waveney and Blyth

See also 

 Bishop of St Edmundsbury and Ipswich

Notes

References

Church of England Statistics 2002

External links

Diocese of Saint Edmundsbury and Ipswich

 
Christian organizations established in 1914
Saint Edmundsbury and Ipswich
Religion in Suffolk